Dairy Farm Nature Park is a 63-hectare nature park located at 100 Dairy Farm Road, Upper Bukit Timah in Singapore.

See also
 List of parks in Singapore

References

External links
 National Parks Board, Singapore
 Dairy Farm Nature Park
 External site about climbing in Dairy Farm

2009 establishments in Singapore
Parks in Singapore